The  is a Japanese toy and anime franchise originally produced by Sunrise (now the primary division of Bandai Namco Filmworks), Nagoya TV, Victor Entertainment and Tokyu Agency, originally created by Takara (now Takara Tomy). The franchise ran from 1990 to 1998, producing eight official series and several side media including Original Video Animations (OVAs), toys, and several memorabilia in Japan. It was one of Sunrise's notable productions in the 90s, and its run play a key role in the reintroduction of the Super Robot genre to the Japanese mainstream.

As of 2022, the rights to the series were now owned by Bandai Namco Entertainment, following the 1993 acquisition of Sunrise, who produced and animated the series.

History

Creation
The Brave series was first conceived by Japanese toy maker Takara after the fallout between the company and Toei Animation regarding continuing Transformers in Japan. Following a decline in the series' popularity that led to the cancellation of the OVA series Transformers: Zone, Takara struck a cooperative deal with the animation studio Sunrise to develop a new franchise and set of toy lines. Japanese candy maker Kabaya also sponsored the franchise as well, also once working with Takara in the Transformers franchise.

At the beginning of the series, the slogan for the franchise was "animation that does not appear in anime magazines", and the intended audience were aged 3 to 5 years old. In fact, the first work in the series, "Brave Exkaiser", was originally planned and produced with the theme off "eliminating complicated themes and settings" in order to be a "pure children's program". However, as the series progressed, the target age and the range of settings and styles of each work gradually expanded, up to the final installment of the series, "The King of Braves GaoGaiGar". It has also gained support from non-fans up to that point. In response to its popularity, the franchise was also developed in various media such as OVAs, games, and drama CDs in addition to the TV series.

As the franchise ended, news of it was announced in the newspaper as the top article of the evening edition of the Asahi Shimbun Nagoya edition on December 22, 1997, and two weeks later, the national edition on January 5, 1998, saying that any mecha animation will be halted due to the declining birthrate and the popularity of video games in Japan. Also, on page 13 of the morning edition of the Tokyo Shimbun on February 4, 1998, the end of this series was reported under the heading "The disappeared giant robot", and in the same article, the audience rating and toy sales were sluggish as to the reason for the end of the series.

During the Takara-Tomy merger in 2006, the Brave series wasn't part of the franchises that will carry over to the new company, with the intellectual rights to it were sold to Bandai Namco Entertainment.

Themes
The overlying theme of each series is "Bravery", the interaction between the robot "Brave", who has a heart and the boy, the will of the mecha, the union of the robots, and other unique themes for each series. With the exception of the relationship between "Brave Exkaiser" and "The Brave Fighter of Sun Fighbird" , there is no direct relationship between each series in terms of world view or time. Therefore, almost all the works are different to each other in terms of themes and motif, and that changes every series.

The robots that appear in the series are called "Brave Robo". Vehicles familiar to children, such as police cars, ambulances, fire engines, airplanes, and bullet trains, are transformed into the brave robos. This is because it was judged that it would be easier for children to sympathize with a familiar vehicle as a motif. Brave Robo can talk at will, and were classified into three types: "advanced life form type" where their life is transferred to a machine such as a vehicle and turned into a robot while "super AI type" where brave robots is made by human hands and granted advanced human-like intelligence and "fusion type" in which the main character fuses with a brave robot at will.

Design
All of the main hero robots' mechanical designs in the Brave series were those of prolific Sunrise mechanical designer Kunio Okawara. In most of the Brave series, there is a main hero robot (usually the most or second-most expensive toy in the line), backed up by one or two support combiner teams and later receiving one or two combiner partners, upgrading the hero to more powerful forms. (The most or second-most powerful form of the hero robot is usually known as its "Great," "Dai," or "Super" form.) A number of supporting characters and enemies across the Brave Series had designs or remolds derived from earlier and present (for the day) Generation One Takara Transformers designs, most notably those of Transformers: Zone and Transformers Battlestars: Return of Convoy (the latter never having its own animated series). The enemy "Geister" characters in Brave Exkaiser (save for their leader, Dino Geist) were actually remolds of first-generation Dinobot toys, for instance. Ultra Raker was also one of those designs whose origin was intended for Transformers and bore little resemblance to their final designs.

There are also similar design elements between the Brave toys and Generation 2/Beast Wars Transformers, which were released around the same time. Many of the Da-Garn toys have light-piped eyes thanks to transparent pieces of plastic in their heads, a design element which many Generation 2 Transformers share. The Goldran DX toyline contains many projectile launchers, something Generation 2 shared as well. In particular, Advenger contains a rotor-launching gimmick identical to that of Rotor Force from Generation 2. Lastly, the elbows of Leon from DX Leonkyzer contain ball joints, a design element that gained much broader use during Generation 2 and even more so during the Beast Wars toy line.

Toys for these robots were created in two sizes: DX ("deluxe") versions that contained more gimmicks and more complicated transformations, and STD ("standard") versions that contained fewer gimmicks and more limited transformations, but often also higher accuracy in reproducing the look of the robot from the anime series. Generally, the transformation of the robots was created by Takara, while the look of the robots was created by Okawara.

Brave series overview
There are currently a total of eight original entries in the Brave Series: one new series released every year, from 1990 to 1997, each with an episode count exceeding 40 in length. Each series is set in separate, unrelated timelines from each other. No further series appear to be planned for development in the near future.

They are the following, sorted by year of first airing:

To date, only GaoGaiGar and Betterman have been licensed for distribution in the United States; their licenses originally held by Media Blasters and Bandai Entertainment, respectively; each company releasing DVD's of the series in the 2000s. GaoGaiGar and its OVA sequel were recently licensed for distribution in Asia via Muse Communication and Discotek Media in the United States while Bettermans license now belongs to Sentai Filmworks.

Unproduced installment
Before GaoGaiGar ended, another show, was planned to continue the franchise but shelved. Fully titled Brave of Light Photogrizer, the show would involve designs based on, at the time, the new technology of digital cameras and then-modern cell phones.

Additional Brave works
Brave Saga and Brave Saga 2
 (title has also been translated by fans as Brave Crusade Baan Gaan, Also occasionally transliterated as Burn Garn) is a game-original series appearing in the first Brave Saga video game for the Sony PlayStation. It is worth noting that Sunrise's official Brave Series web site considers Baan Gaan the ninth Brave series, even though it was not fully produced. Sunrise even produced animated transformation and merging sequences to go with the game and a fully animated intro. Just like in Exkaiser, the Braves are digital alien spirits possessing bodies made by VARS (Valiant Attack and Rescue Squad). Fighting toys used in tournaments, to be exact. The main character of the series is the shy Shunpei Serizawa. Baan possessed his toy to help his master, Astral fight the evil forces of Grandark. Shunpei's friend Hiro and Baan's teammate Spherion were corrupted by Grandark into the evil Guilty and Guildion. Baan combines with the Gaan Dasher truck to form Baan Gaan, while Spherion/Guildion combines with the Mach/Dark Fighter to become Mach Spherion/Dark Guildion, When Mach Spherion is purified, he and Baan Gaan combine into Great Baan Gaan. Additionally, VARS made Baan Gaan 3 support drones he can combine with to fight on different terrain: a narwhal turns him into Drill Baan Gaan, an eagle turns him into Wing Baan Gaan, and a saber-toothed tiger turns him into Power Baan Gaan. 
 
Brave Saga 2, also released for the PlayStation, can be considered a final re-telling of the Brave Series as it features virtually all Brave Series characters, mecha and human alike, from the previous generation. Although parallel universes are used to explain why series such as Brave Express Might Gaine can be involved in the plot, the story assumed that at least some of the series, noticeably GaoGaiGar and Baan Gaan, happen at around the same time and in the same world. Generally, GaoGaiGar storyline is considered to be the 'side-story' while Baan Gaan served as the main event, with other Yūsha participate in either of the story. Also, a general time line is given to some of the work, such as stating that the entire events within The Brave Fighter of Legend Da-Garn inspired the creation of Grand Police Department in Brave Police J-Decker, while  the events in The Brave Fighter of Sun Fighbird is part of the reason why Brave Command Dagwon is formed.

Similar to the Super Robot Wars series of games, there are some non-Brave Series series being involved in the plot, and they are consider to be Real Robot, among them is Armored Trooper Votoms which was animated by Sunrise with the toys and merchandise being provided by Takara. Shizuma of the Sword clan his the vessel of an ultimate weapon against transdimensional demons called Asmodians. But in a surprise attack, he lost his physical body and his soul was split into the weapon's six elements: fire, water, earth, air, light, and darkness. His mother, the priestess, gave up her life so Shizuma would have a provisional body to fight back. Shizuma has machines called the Varion series that allow him to fight the Asmodians. Motovarion is a motorcycle that interface with a jet, an armored fire truck, and an amphibious bullet train that can combine into 3 different robots: Saber, Ace, and Max Varion. It is later revealed that there was a robot called Varion sealed within Motovarion that can combine with a hi-tech space shuttle to form Victorion, And when Shizuma finally gets all the elements of his soul, Victorion evolves into Galaxion. Additionally, 2 of Baan's teammates called Magna and Flash arrive as trains. They can combine into Magna Bomber, and/or Flash Kaiser.

A spinoff game called Brave Saga New Astaria was released for the Game Boy Color. A robot called Gunbar can combine with a dog robot called 01 to form Gunbar 01. Zetter combines with an aircraft to form Zetter 99. Their father combines with the Big Condor, a subterrene, and a rescue vehicle to form Big Father.

As the consideration of toy-safety measures, sharp edges and parts were avoided in animated Brave Series to prevent redesigning parts. As Baan Gaan was not made into animation, the mechanical design were slightly different from other leading Brave Series robots - many sharp edges can be seen in Baan Gaan, Mach Sperion, and Great Baan Gaan. The combination process of aforementioned Brave Series robots basically proceed features of every previous Brave Series' combinations. The CM Company did make toys of Baan Gaan and Mach Spherion, but not of the Varion robots or train brothers.

New Century Brave Wars
Brave Wars is the first and only Brave series game to be produced for the PlayStation 2. Quantum Leap Layzelber''' (Ryoushi Choyaku Layzelber, title can also be interpreted as Quantum Leap Rayzelver and Quantum Leap Rayserver. It is worth noting that Layzelber is not counted among the Brave series by Sunrise). Chyota is the partner of an advanced robot called Layzer, who transforms into a Bugatti Chiron and combines with a VTOL jet called the Rayhawk to form Layzelber, who aims to stop the 6 Knights of Varios from conquering the multiverse. Layzelber can also combine with another jet to form Sky Layzelber, a drill tank to form Ground Layzelber, and a high-speed submarine to form Marine Layzelber. Or Layzer can skip the Rayhawk and combine with the other 3 support vehicles to form Dailayzer. Chyota's rival Gallio has a robot called Emperios that can combine with a racing limousine to form Emperios Forte, who can combine with an armored vehicle to form Emperios Fortissimo. Gallio is aided by his servants Roberto and Fiore. In a nod to Baan Gaan, Layzer is blue and Emperios is red, and the robots are rivals. Layzer's small support vehicles also function like Baan Gaan's animals. Both boys’ families each have some scientific skill used to make the robots.

The first entry in the Eldran series, Zettai Muteki Raijin-Oh was also added to the game. This is mainly because of the many similarities between the Yūsha series and the Eldran series as they all featured transforming and combining robots and both series were animated by Sunrise. The only key difference was that the Eldran toys were produced by Tomy. However Tomy and Takara later merged into Takara Tomy, so that both series fall under the same corporate ownership allowing Raijin-Oh to be part of the game, along with Might Gaine, J-Decker, Dagwon, GaoGaiGar and the non-canon Layzelber. The other Brave robots and the other Eldran robots were not featured in the game. Unlike the Brave Sagas, Brave wars was made by Winkysoft and published by Atlus rather than Takara, who only licensed the game.

Cultural influence
The influence of the Brave Series can be officially seen in various anime and manga works produced after the franchise's cancellation. Character designer Hirokazu Hisayuki and director Mitsuo Fukuda used the concepts from the first Brave Saga game in the anime Gear Fighter Dendoh, with the plot and concept similarities between Dendoh and Baan Gaan are extremely numerous including the mechanics for how the machines combine with their animal-robot helpers, an emphasis on a running conflict between two particular Super Robots (one blue and one red), the dual-protagonist structure, and the idea of child pilots fighting with the support of a group of older pilots and technicians (VARS in Baan Gaan, and GEAR in Dendoh). While Dendoh was only a modest commercial success, the show was received warmly by critics, and the team has since gone on to become responsible for profitable series such as My-HiME, Mobile Suit Gundam SEED and  Mobile Suit Gundam SEED Destiny.

Following Dendoh, Sunrise took a final stab at resurrecting the Brave style of television series by having some Dendoh staffers return to work on Machine Robo Rescue, based on a modern-day reworking of Bandai and PLEX's own Machine Robo toy line. Rescue combined all of the basic storytelling tropes of the original six, kid-friendly Brave series with a truly vast toy line and an early Sunrise attempt at blending 2D animation (the characters) with 3D animation (the robots). While the toys were popular and the anime did well with older audiences, the 3D animation was widely criticized, and overall the effort failed to recapture the original popularity of the Brave Series. Sunrise would not attempt another 2D/3D series until 2006, with the well-received series Zegapain.

Takara briefly returned to the Brave series' overall premise—that of producing interstitial properties with themes similar to that of Transformers—with the release of Dennou Boukenki Webdiver and Daigunder. Both properties yielded anime television series featuring transforming robots with either their own minds or the ability to "meld" with heroic children, and toys that could interact with TV screens as video games. However, both Webdiver and Daigunder seem to have faded into obscurity. 15 years later Takara again returned to the Brave-like premise once again this time collaborating with OLM, Inc. to create shows like Tomica Hyper Rescue Drive Head Kidō Kyūkyū Keisatsu, Tomica Bond Combination Earth Granner and Shinkansen Henkei Robo Shinkalion THE ANIMATION. Takara also once brought the Brave-like premise to Transformers with Transformers Go!.

There are currently no plans to continue the Brave Series, nor produce another children's anime series in its vein—although Studio 7 has been allowed to continue GaoGaiGar'' projects for older fans. The franchise's "30th Anniversary" occurred in 2020, with an official exhibit hosted by Sunrise from  December 11, 2020, to January 17, 2021.

References

External links

 
Anime companies
Toy brands
Transforming toy robots
Takara video games
Takara Tomy franchises
Bandai Namco franchises
Sunrise (company)
Super robot anime and manga
Mass media franchises introduced in 1990
Video games about mecha
Transformers (franchise)